L was recorded at several shows from moe.'s Fall 1999 tour, Former drummer Jim Loughlin returned to the band earlier in the year as a multi-instrumental utility man, adding to the drum work of Vinnie Amico.

This set features the first released versions of "Can't Seem To Find" and "Captain America", predating their release on Dither by eight months.

The album reached a peak position of #29 on the Billboard Heatseekers chart.

Jammy Award winner (2000) for best live archival release.

Track listing

Disc one (67:25)
 Spine of a Dog (Derhak, Garvey, moe.) – 12:54 →
Nov. 19, 1999 @ House of Blues, West Hollywood, CA
 Buster (Derhak, moe.) – 10:31
Nov. 19, 1999 @ House of Blues, West Hollywood, CA
 Can't Seem to Find (Schnier) – 5:36 
Nov. 17, 1999 @ The Joint, Las Vegas, NV
 Seat of My Pants (Schnier) – 11:29
Nov. 26, 1999 @ The Fillmore, San Francisco, CA
 Yodelittle (Schnier, moe.) – 15:25
Nov. 12, 1999 @ Boulder Theater, Boulder, CO
 Plane Crash (Derhak, moe.) – 11:32
Oct. 9, 1999 @ 9:30 Club, Washington, DC

Disc two (73:52)
 Akimbo (Garvey, moe.) – 8:24
Nov. 27, 1999 @ The Fillmore, San Francisco, CA
 Captain America (Derhak) – 4:36
Nov. 20, 1999 @ House of Blues, West Hollywood, CA
 Meat (Schnier, moe.) – 8:03
Nov. 27, 1999 @ The Fillmore, San Francisco, CA
 St. Augustine (Derhak, moe.) – 10:39
Nov. 26, 1999 @ The Fillmore, San Francisco, CA
 Timmy Tucker (Derhak, moe.) – 23:25 →
Oct. 8, 1999 @ 9:30 Club, Washington, DC
 Recreational Chemistry (Schnier, moe.) – 18:47
Oct. 8, 1999 @ 9:30 Club, Washington, DC

Personnel
moe.
Vinnie Amico - percussion, drums, producer
Rob Derhak - bass, songwriter, vocals, producer
Chuck Garvey - guitars (acoustic, electric), songwriter, vocals, producer
Jim Loughlin - guitar (acoustic), flute, percussion, songwriter, drums, producer
Al Schnier - guitars (acoustic, electric), mandolin, songwriter, vocals, producer

Debbie Amico - photography
Chris Burrows - production coordination
Bil Emmons - engineer
Fred Kevorkian - mastering
John Siket - producer, mixing

References

External links
moe.'s webpage
[ All Music link]

Jammy Award winners
Moe (band) live albums
2000 live albums